The Gilera Runner is a scooter manufactured by Italian company Piaggio under the Gilera brand, designed by Luciano Marabese of Marabese Design Srl. It is noted for its unusual style, high performance and good handling. The Runner was initially only available with two stroke engines with 125 cc and 180 cc four stroke versions arriving in 1998  and the larger two stroke versions phased out. The model range was revised in 2005 with an all new model introduced in 2009. The 125, 180 and 250cc models were not restricted.

Two stroke models

The first incarnation of the Gilera Runner was a 50cc that was released in 1997 in Europe. The 50cc model went through a number of revisions; in 1998, a rear disc brake was added with the Gilera Runner 50DD (Double Disc). The colour scheme was also revised with the release of the Runner 50SP. The direct injection Runner Purejet 50 was released in 2003 with lower emissions.

In 1998, the  FX Runner was introduced which had the same styling as the 50cc. In 1999, the SP model was released. The biggest difference between the FX (FXR) and the SP is the FX had a  petrol tank and battery stowed near the spark plug and a rear drum brake. The SP has a  petrol tank, the battery is stowed under the seat and it has a rear disc brake.

In 1999, the FXR  was introduced and was by far the fastest of the Runners including the new generation  four strokes. It was noted for its high performance and great handling. Unfortunately it has a high fuel consumption.

Four stroke models
The first generation of Gilera Runner had four-stroke variants added initially in VX 125 (124 cc) and VXR 180 guises. The VXR 180 was replaced by the larger capacity VXR 200 (198 cc) in mid 2002. The four-stroke Runner was equipped with a liquid cooled, four valve version of Piaggio's LEADER engine. All of these models came with an immobiliser with programmed keys.

Second Generation (2005)

A second generation of the Runner saw the first major redesign since its original introduction. The revised models were launched in 2005 with a line up of three models which consisted of the two-stroke carburetor SP 50, fuel injected Purejet 50 and the four-stroke VX 125. A revised VXR 200 became available in spring 2006.

The current model line up consists of Runner ST 125 and Runner ST 200 which utilize the LEADER 4-valve engine. Now Runner has an analog-digital board, bigger wheels, the seat opens by pressing the steering wheel lock.

On two-stroke models the oil filler hole has now been moved under the front of the seat, and there is a basic tool in the small compartment at the back.

The 2008 models had minor updates.

References

External links

 Official Gilera website

Motor scooters
Gilera motorcycles
Motorcycles introduced in 1997
Two-stroke motorcycles